Eopachyrucos is an extinct genus of interatheriid notoungulates that lived from the Middle Eocene to the Late Oligocene of Argentina and Uruguay. Fossils of this genus have been found in the Sarmiento Formation of Argentina and the Fray Bentos Formation of Uruguay.

Taxonomy 
Eopachyrucos was first named in 1901 by Florentino Ameghino based on fragmentary remains found in the Sarmiento Formation of Argentina. He originally considered it as a member of the family Hegetotheriidae, as an ancestor of Pachyrukhos, as reflected in its name ("dawn Pachyrukhos), however, recent studies have confirmed it to be a member of the family Interatheriidae, more specifically within the subfamily Interatheriinae.

The following cladogram of the Interatheriinae is based on Vera et al. 2017, showing the position of Eopachyrucos.

References 

Typotheres
Prehistoric placental genera
Oligocene mammals of South America
Eocene mammals of South America
Deseadan
Tinguirirican
Divisaderan
Mustersan
Paleogene Argentina
Oligocene Uruguay
Fossils of Argentina
Fossils of Uruguay
Taxa named by Florentino Ameghino
Fossil taxa described in 1901
Golfo San Jorge Basin
Sarmiento Formation